Teretiopsis thaumastopsis is a species of sea snail, a marine gastropod mollusk in the family Raphitomidae.

Description
The length of the shell attains 10 mm, its diameter 5.5 mm.

(Original description in Latin and French) The shell is thin. The spire has a conoid shape. It is not much elevated and acuminate at the top. The spire consists of six whorls separated by a well-marked suture. The protoconch contains four embryonic whorls: the first is smooth, the next two are reticulated, the fourth likewise reticulated on its lower half, but decorated, at the top, with arched longitudinal folds. On the body whorl, a second keel begins at the point of contact of the outer lip and the recurrent cords. They fill the entire lower part of the shell. The shell contains numerous, weak growth lines. The aperture is pyriform, terminating in a fairly long, open siphonal canal. The columella is at first almost perpendicular, then slightly twists towards the base, which is acuminate. The slender outer lip is sharp, somewhat polygonous and slightly indented at the top. The shell has a white color with the exception of the embryonic whorls which are yellowish-brown.

Distribution
T. thaumatopsis can be found in the Gulf of Mexico, ranging from the coast of Georgia to western Florida.; in the Atlantic Ocean; also off the Azores at bathyal depths.

References

 Gofas, S.; Le Renard, J.; Bouchet, P. (2001). Mollusca, in: Costello, M.J. et al. (Ed.) (2001). European register of marine species: a check-list of the marine species in Europe and a bibliography of guides to their identification. Collection Patrimoines Naturels, 50: pp. 180–213

External links
 Dall W. H. (1927). Small shells from dredgings off the southeast coast of the United states by the United States Fisheries Steamer "Albatross", in 1885 and 1886. Proceedings of the United States National Museum, 70(18): 1-134
  Rosenberg, G.; Moretzsohn, F.; García, E. F. (2009). Gastropoda (Mollusca) of the Gulf of Mexico, Pp. 579–699 in: Felder, D.L. and D.K. Camp (eds.), Gulf of Mexico–Origins, Waters, and Biota. Texas A&M Press, College Station, Texas
 Kantor, Yu.I. & Sysoev, A.S. (1989) The morphology of toxoglossan gastropods lacking a radula, with a description of a new species and genus of Turridae. Journal of Molluscan Studies, 55, 537–550
 

thaumastopsis
Gastropods described in 1896